Szabina Tálosi (born 20 January 1989 in Nagykanizsa) is a Hungarian football defender currently playing in the Hungarian First Division for Viktória FC, with whom she has also played the Champions League. She is a member of the Hungarian national team.

References

External links
 

1989 births
Living people
Hungarian women's footballers
Viktória FC-Szombathely players
People from Nagykanizsa
Women's association football defenders
Hungary women's international footballers
FC Südburgenland players
Expatriate women's footballers in Austria
Hungarian expatriate sportspeople in Austria
Sportspeople from Zala County